Siskiwitia latebra is a moth in the family Cosmopterigidae. It was described by Ronald W. Hodges in 1978. It is found in North America, where it has been recorded from Arkansas and South Carolina.

References

Moths described in 1978
Chrysopeleiinae